John Francis Anderson was an officer in the Union Army during the American Civil War.

Military career
When the war broke out, Anderson who was the son of Maine's former Governor Hugh J. Anderson was initially commissioned First Lieutenant in the militia; and on September 2, 1861, Anderson became the adjutant of the 24th Regiment Massachusetts Volunteer Infantry.  He was appointed to Maj. Gen. John G. Foster's staff as a major and an aide-de-camp on June 9, 1863 and served with that officer for most of the remainder of the war, resigning on March 27, 1865.  On December 11, 1866, President Andrew Johnson nominated Major Anderson to the honorary grade of brevet brigadier general, to rank from March 13, 1865 and the United States Senate confirmed the award on February 6, 1867.

See also

List of Massachusetts generals in the American Civil War
Massachusetts in the American Civil War

Notes

References
 Bowen, James L., Massachusetts in the War, 1861-1865, p. 371. Clark W. Bryan & Co, Springfield, MA, 1889. oclc=1986476. Source url: https://books.google.com/books?id=K0tLhkfW1wwC&printsec=frontcover&source=gbs_slider_thumb#v=onepage&q=&f=false
 Eicher, John H. and Eicher, David J., Civil War High Commands. Stanford University Press, Stanford, CA, 2001. .

External links

Union Army officers
People of Massachusetts in the American Civil War
People of Maine in the American Civil War
Military personnel from Portland, Maine
1832 births
1902 deaths
Place of birth missing